The NCHC Defensive Forward of the Year is an annual award given out at the conclusion of the National Collegiate Hockey Conference regular season to the best defensive forward in the conference as voted by the coaches of each NCHC team.

The Defensive Forward of the Year was first awarded in 2014 and is a successor to the Best Defensive Forward which was discontinued after the conference dissolved due to the 2013–14 NCAA conference realignment.

Award winners

Winners by school

See also
NCHC Awards
Best Defensive Forward

References

External links

College ice hockey trophies and awards in the United States
National Collegiate Hockey Conference